Ophonus is a ground beetle genus native to the Palearctic (including Europe), the Near East, the Nearctic and North Africa. It contains the following species in the following subgenera:

 Subgenus Ophonus (Brachyophonus)
 Ophonus krueperi Apfelbeck, 1904
 Ophonus vignai Sciaky, 1987 

 Subgenus Ophonus (Hesperophonus)
 Ophonus azureus (Fabricius, 1775) 
 Ophonus bartoni (Maran, 1935) 
 Ophonus chlorizans Solsky, 1874 
 Ophonus convexicollis Menetries, 1832 
 Ophonus cribricollis (Dejean, 1829) 
 Ophonus jailensis (Schauberger, 1926) 
 Ophonus libanigena Brulerie, 1876 
 Ophonus longicollis Rambur, 1838 
 Ophonus longipilis Sciaky, 1987 
 Ophonus minimus Motschulsky, 1845 
 Ophonus pumilio (Dejean, 1829) 
 Ophonus rebellus (Schauberger, 1926) 
 Ophonus rotundatus (Dejean, 1829) 
 Ophonus similis (Dejean, 1829) 
 Ophonus subquadratus (Dejean, 1829) 
 Ophonus wolfi Wrase, 1995

 Subgenus Ophonus (Incisophonus)
 Ophonus incisus (Dejean, 1829) 

 Subgenus Ophonus (Macrophonus)
 Ophonus houskai (Jedlicka, 1955) 
 Ophonus oblongus (Schaum, 1858) 
 Ophonus phoenix (Tschitscherine, 1902) 

 Subgenus Ophonus (Metophonus)
 Ophonus achilles Sciaky, 1987 
 Ophonus austrocaspicus Kataev & Belousov, 2001 
 Ophonus berberus Antoine, 1925 
 Ophonus castaneipennis Sciaky, 1987 
 Ophonus brevicollis (Audinet-Serville, 1821) 
 Ophonus cordatus (Duftschmid, 1812) 
 Ophonus cribratus (Peyron, 1858) 
 Ophonus cribrellus Reiche & Saulcy, 1855 
 Ophonus cunii Fairmaire, 1880 
 Ophonus davatchii (Morvan, 1981) 
 Ophonus elegantulus Sciaky, 1987 
 Ophonus ferrugatus Reitter, 1902 
 Ophonus gabrieleae Wrase, 1987 
 Ophonus gammeli (Schauberger, 1932) 
 Ophonus heinzianus Wrase, 1996
 Ophonus hittita Sciaky, 1987 
 Ophonus hystrix Reitter, 1894 
 Ophonus israelita Brulerie, 1876 
 Ophonus jeanneli Sciaky, 1987 
 Ophonus judaeus Brulerie, 1876 
 Ophonus laticollis Mannerheim, 1825 
 Ophonus melletii (Heer, 1837) 
 Ophonus ophonoides (Jedlicka, 1958) 
 Ophonus parallelus (Dejean, 1829) 
 Ophonus puncticeps Stephens, 1828 
 Ophonus puncticollis (Paykull, 1798) 
 Ophonus rufibarbis (Fabricius, 1792) 
 Ophonus rupicola (Sturm, 1818) 
 Ophonus sahlbergianus (Lutshnik, 1922) 
 Ophonus scharifi (Morvan, 1977) 
 Ophonus schaubergerianus (Puel, 1937) 
 Ophonus sciakyi Wrase, 1990 
 Ophonus stricticollis Tschitscherine, 1893 
 Ophonus subsinuatus Rey, 1886 
 Ophonus syriacus (Dejean, 1829) 
 Ophonus transversus Motschulsky, 1844 
 Ophonus veluchianus (G.Muller, 1931) 
 Ophonus wrasei Sciaky, 1987 
 Ophonus xaxarsi (Schauberger, 1928) 

 Subgenus Ophonus (Ophonus)
 Ophonus ardosiacus (Lutshnik, 1922) 
 Ophonus battus Reitter, 1900 
 Ophonus diffinis (Dejean, 1829) 
 Ophonus franziniorum Sciaky, 1987 
 Ophonus heinzi Wrase, 1991 
 Ophonus opacus (Dejean, 1829) 
 Ophonus quadricollis (Dejean, 1831) 
 Ophonus sabulicola (Panzer, 1796) 
 Ophonus stictus Stephens, 1828

References

Harpalinae
 
Carabidae genera
Taxa named by Pierre François Marie Auguste Dejean